Suzanne Marie Kwasny (married name Ritchie, born 1962) is a Canadian former backstroke swimmer. She competed in the 200m backstroke at the 1978 Commonwealth Games, notably briefly holding the Commonwealth Games all time record in this event before finishing fifth in the final. Kwasny went on to become a rower, joining the Thunder Bay Rowing Club and helping them to two gold medals at the Canadian Championships. For her achievements both in rowing and swimming, Kwasny was inducted into the Northwestern Ontario Sports Hall of Fame in 1995.

References

External links
 
 

1962 births
Living people
Canadian female backstroke swimmers
Olympic swimmers of Canada
Swimmers at the 1980 Summer Olympics
Swimmers at the 1978 Commonwealth Games